Ya Nochnoy Huligan (I am a Night Hooligan) is the first Russian album by Russian pop star Dima Bilan released on June 12, 2003. It was distributed by Gala Records and the First Musical Publishing House (Первое Музыкальное Издательство) in Russia. It was recorded in Star Studios and Paul Vorotnikov and Dmitry Lykov mixed the tracks.

Track listing

I am a Night Hooligan+ 
In 2004, the reissue of the album came out including 19 songs, 15 of the original + four new tracks:

 Бессердечная (Heartless)
 В последний раз (The last time)
 Остановите музыку (Stop the music)
 Тёмная ночь (The Dark Night)

References 

2003 debut albums
Albums produced by Yuri Aizenshpis
Dima Bilan albums